The 80th United States Colored Infantry Regiment was an African-American unit of the United States Colored Troops during the American Civil War. It was organized from the 8th Corps d'Afrique Infantry and attached to the Port Hudson garrison in Louisiana. The 80th Colored Infantry Regiment operated throughout Louisiana until 1866, when the troops scouted in Texas until the men mustered out in March 1867.

History
On February 12, 1863, Cyrus Hamlin was appointed colonel of the yet-to-be organized 80th U.S. Colored Infantry. In the meantime, the Siege of Port Hudson occurred in July 1863, bringing down the fall of the garrison. It was then used to house colored troops commanded by Hamlin.

First called the 80th Regiment, United States Colored Infantry, it was raised on September 1, 1863 and attached to Daniel Ullman's Brigade of the Corps d'Afrique, Department of the Gulf until December 1863. It was then with the 2nd Brigade, 1st Division of the Corp d'Afrique until March 1864, when it was at the garrison at Port Hudson. On April 4, 1864, the regiment was designated the 80th United States Colored Infantry Regiment.

Conditions
Two white soldiers from Alexandria were arrested after they tried to convince a Corporal of the 80th Colored Infantry to work in their fields. The regimental commander gave "them a good lecture on the altered condition of affairs, and the absurdity of attempting to treat colored soldiers as slaves."

Notable people
 Henry Demas, Louisiana politician and former slave

See also
List of United States Colored Troops Civil War units

References

Further reading
 

African-American history of Louisiana
United States Colored Troops Civil War units and formations